Sabri Sarıoğlu (born 26 July 1984) is a retired Turkish professional footballer who most notably played for Turkish football club Galatasaray.

Club career

Galatasaray

Born in Çarşamba, Samsun Province, Sabri has spent his entire career with Galatasaray so far, having risen through the ranks of the Galatasaray youth team. He was first called up to feature for the first team, at the age of 17, in the 2001–02 season under Mircea Lucescu. He was in Galatasaray official squad list for UEFA Champions League 2001–02. 2001–02 season also marked the first time he made his way into Galatasaray bench for an official match, but he didn't play a single minute. He made his competitive debut for the first team in the Turkcell Super League match the following season, in 2002–03, against Trabzonspor on 4 May 2003, in the side managed by Fatih Terim.

He marked his 100th league appearance for Galatasaray on 10 December 2006 against Bursaspor, by scoring a goal after fantastic build up play from his own half of the pitch.

After the former captain Arda Turan's departure to Atlético Madrid, he became the club captain in September 2011.

Sabri Sarıoğlu's contract was not renewed at the end of 2016–17 season and his Galatasaray career was effectively over.

International career
He was a regular member of the Turkey squad. He was part of the 23-man squad for the European Championships, and registered one assist during the finals of Euro 2008.

Career statistics

Club
.

European Cup goals

International

International goals

Honours
Galatasaray
Süper Lig (6): 2001–02, 2005–06, 2007–08, 2011–12, 2012–13, 2014–15
Türkiye Kupası (4): 2004–05, 2013–14, 2014–15, 2015–16
Süper Kupa (5): 2008, 2012, 2013, 2015, 2016

Turkey
 UEFA European Championship bronze medalist: 2008

References

External links

 Profile at Galatasaray.org
 
 
 
 
 
 
 

1984 births
Living people
People from Çarşamba
Turkish footballers
Turkey international footballers
Turkey under-21 international footballers
UEFA Euro 2008 players
Galatasaray A2 footballers
Galatasaray S.K. footballers
Süper Lig players
Turkey youth international footballers
Association football fullbacks